Victor Pagliari Giro (born March 10, 1994), commonly known as PC, is a Brazilian professional footballer who plays as a left back for San Antonio FC in the USL Championship.

Career

Corinthians
PC began his career in the youth system of famous Brazilian club Corinthians. He made his debut for Corinthians B in 2013.

He acquired his nickname due to his resemblance to a fellow youth player named Pablo Cesar.

Belenenses
For the 2013–14 season he was sent on loan to Primeira Liga club Belenenses. He made his debut for the Portuguese club on September 25, 2013 in a Taça da Liga match against C.D. Santa Clara, starting the match in a 0–0 draw.

Fort Lauderdale Strikers
In early 2015 he was sent on loan to Fort Lauderdale Strikers. On April 11, 2015, he scored his first goal for the Fort Lauderdale Strikers against the Jacksonville Armada FC in a match they won 2–1, earning a spot on the NASL Team of the Week. On April 23, 2015, it was announced that the Strikers had signed PC outright from Corinthians on a multi-year contract.

Tampa Bay Rowdies
On July 24, 2016, PC was sold to the Tampa Bay Rowdies. He had one goal and one assist in 14 appearances with Tampa Bay.

Orlando City
On January 4, 2017 it was announced that he was signed by Major League Soccer side Orlando City. On September 24, 2017, PC was shown a red card during a match against the Portland Timbers after he elbowed Diego Chará in the face. PC played in eight MLS games and one further US Open Cup match registering one assist during the 2017 season.

PC scored his first goal with Orlando City on June 6, 2018 in a 2018 U.S. Open Cup match against Miami United FC. He also featured in eight MLS games in 2018. On December 9, 2018, PC was traded to the Vancouver Whitecaps FC in exchange for the Whitecaps' natural third-round pick in the 2019 MLS SuperDraft.

References

External links

foradejogo.net

Brazilian footballers
Brazilian expatriate footballers
Brazilian expatriate sportspeople in the United States
Expatriate soccer players in the United States
Fort Lauderdale Strikers players
Tampa Bay Rowdies players
Orlando City SC players
Vancouver Whitecaps FC players
San Antonio FC players
Living people
1994 births
North American Soccer League players
Orlando City B players
USL Championship players
Major League Soccer players
Association football defenders
Footballers from São Paulo